Internet and Mobile Association of India (IAMAI) is a not-for-profit industry body representing the interests of online and mobile value added services industry. It is registered under The Societies Registration Act, 1860.

History
The need for an association of Internet companies in India was felt in early 2000. India's early internet pioneers such as Ajit Balakrishnan of and Rajesh Jain established successful companies but did not build an ecosystem. In 2002, baazee.com's Avnish Bajaj and Mouthshut.com's Faisal Farooqui exchanged conversations over email to establish an informal association of CEOs in the Internet space. They suggested a name "Council of High Tech CEOs" as majority of the Internet start-ups, were tech heavy.

Mandate 
Its mandate is to expand and enhance the online and mobile value added services sectors. IAMAI also put forward the problems and requirements of the businesses to the consumers, shareholders, investors and the government of India. The main purpose of the Internet and Mobile Association of India is to improve and expand the value added services pertaining to mobiles and several online services.

Working groups 

 India EdTech Consortium (IEC) On 12 January, 2022; IAMAI created a self-regulatory body along with Physics Wallah, Byju's, Simplilearn, Unacademy, upGrad, Vedantu and others to suggest and manage the ethics' codes and guidelines for Indian online education industry.

References

Internet in India
Organisations based in Mumbai
2004 establishments in Maharashtra
Organizations established in 2004